Wo Hang is an area in Sha Tau Kok, Hong Kong. The term is part of the name of several places in Hong Kong, including:

Ha Wo Hang, a village
Sheung Wo Hang, a village
Tso Wo Hang, a village
Wo Hang Tai Long, a village